Lai Wah is one of the 31 constituencies of the Kwai Tsing District Council. The seat elects one member of the council every four years. It was created in 2003. Its boundary is loosely based on the Lai Yan Court and Wah Lai Estate.

Councillors represented

Election results

2010s

2000s

References

2011 District Council Election Results (Kwai Tsing)
2007 District Council Election Results (Kwai Tsing)
2003 District Council Election Results (Kwai Tsing)

Constituencies of Hong Kong
Constituencies of Kwai Tsing District Council
2003 establishments in Hong Kong
Constituencies established in 2003
Lai King